The Astronaut Monument is a monument commemorating the training of Apollo astronauts in northern Iceland in 1965 and 1967. It is located outside the Exploration Museum in Húsavík, and contains the names of 32 Apollo astronauts who were sent to Iceland for training in geology for crewed lunar missions. Fourteen of the trainee astronauts later flew to the Moon, and seven of those conducted geology work on the lunar surface.

The monument includes the names of the astronauts, the American and Icelandic flags, the insignia of the Apollo program, and features two steel globes on top of two basalt columns to represent the Earth and the Moon.

The monument was unveiled on July 15, 2015, by the grandchildren of Apollo 11 astronaut Neil Armstrong.

Apollo geology trainees
The 32 Apollo astronauts listed on the monument are:

 William Anders 
 Neil Armstrong 
 Charles Bassett
 Alan Bean 
 Vance D. Brand
 Gerald P. Carr
 Eugene Cernan 
 Roger B. Chaffee
 Walter Cunningham
 Charles Duke 
 Donn F. Eisele
 Joseph Engle
 Ronald Evans 
 Owen Garriott
 Edward Gibson
 Fred Haise 
 Joseph P. Kerwin
 Don L. Lind
 Jack R. Lousma
 Ken Mattingly
 Bruce McCandless
 Curt Michel
 Edgar Mitchell 
 William Pogue
 Stuart Roosa 
 Harrison Schmitt
 Russell Schweickart
 David Scott 
 John L. Swigert
 Paul J. Weitz
 Clifton Williams
 Alfred Worden 

Seven of the trainees did geological research and sample collection while on the Moon: Armstrong, Bean, Cernan, Duke, Mitchell, Schmitt, and Scott.

Seven others flew to the Moon but did not land: Anders, Evans, Haise, Mattingly, Roosa, Swigert, and Worden.

See also
 Astronaut training
 Geology of the Moon
Moon rocks
Lunar soil
 Lunar Receiving Laboratory
 Lunar Sample Laboratory Facility

References

Monuments and memorials in Iceland
Museums in Iceland
Science and technology in Iceland
Iceland–United States relations
Húsavík
Apollo program
Monuments and memorials to explorers
History of spaceflight
William Anders
Neil Armstrong
Alan Bean
Gene Cernan
Charles Duke
Ronald Evans (astronaut)
Fred Haise
Ken Mattingly
Edgar Mitchell
Stuart Roosa
Harrison Schmitt
Rusty Schweickart
David Scott
Jack Swigert
Alfred Worden